Fairfield Township is the name of some places in the U.S. state of Minnesota:
Fairfield Township, Crow Wing County, Minnesota
Fairfield Township, Swift County, Minnesota

See also
Fairfield Township (disambiguation)

Minnesota township disambiguation pages